Robin James Andrew (6 October 1912 – 25 August 1985) was a New Zealand lawn bowls player.

Andrew represented New Zealand at the 1958 British Empire and Commonwealth Games in Cardiff, finishing 10th in the men's fours, alongside Stanley Snedden, Jeff Barron, and Bill Hampton.

In 1954, Andrew won the singles title at the New Zealand lawn bowls championships, representing the Onehunga club.

References

1912 births
1985 deaths
New Zealand male bowls players
Commonwealth Games competitors for New Zealand
Bowls players at the 1958 British Empire and Commonwealth Games
20th-century New Zealand people